Olive Green is an unincorporated community in Noble County, in the U.S. state of Ohio.

History
Olive Green had its start in 1856 when a store was built there; later that same year a mill was built there as well. The community derives its name from the nearby Olive Green Creek. A post office was established at Olive Green in 1857, and remained in operation until 1925.

References

Unincorporated communities in Noble County, Ohio
1856 establishments in Ohio
Populated places established in 1856
Unincorporated communities in Ohio